The Raven 2XS is a Canadian aerobatic amateur-built biplane, designed and produced by Raven Aircraft of Surrey, British Columbia. The aircraft is supplied as a kit or as plans for amateur construction.

Design and development
The 2XS features a strut-braced biplane layout, a two-seats-in-tandem enclosed cockpit under a bubble canopy, fixed conventional landing gear and a single engine in tractor configuration.

The aircraft is made from mixed construction, using welded steel tubing, aluminum and wood, with its flying surfaces covered in doped aircraft fabric. The 2XS has a roll rate of 330 degrees/second. Construction time from the supplied kit is estimated as 2000 hours.

Operational history
By November 2012 one example had been registered in the United States with the Federal Aviation Administration, but none in its home country with Transport Canada.

Specifications (2XS)

References

External links

Photo of a Raven 2XS

Homebuilt aircraft
Aerobatic aircraft
Single-engined tractor aircraft